The Type C4-class ship were the largest cargo ships built by the United States Maritime Commission (MARCOM) during World War II. The design was originally developed for the American-Hawaiian Lines in 1941, but in late 1941 the plans were taken over by the MARCOM.

Eighty-one ships were built as cargo or troopships in four shipyards: Kaiser Richmond, California (35 ships), Kaiser Vancouver, Washington (20 ships), Sun Shipbuilding and Drydock in Chester, Pennsylvania (20 ships) and Bethlehem Steel Sparrows Point, Maryland (6 ships).

They were followed post-war by thirty-seven of the larger C4-S-1 class, also known as the Mariner class.

List of Type C4 ships

General series

C4-S-A1 DWT: 14,863.
Built by Kaiser Shipyards at Permanente No. 3 in Richmond, California, for the US Army Transportation Corps then transferred later to the US Navy. The 30 ships were built from 1942 to 1945. Sun Shipbuilding of Chester, Pennsylvania, originally had a contract to build 30 of the C4 ships. The USMC prioritized Sun's expertise in building urgently needed T2-SE-A1 tankers and withdrew 20 C4s from Sun and assigned them to Kaiser's Richmond, California yard. Kaiser's C4 troop ship construction became Navy troop ships ("General" names), Sun's became WSA troopships operated by commercial agents. In the 1960 the Navy sold of most of the General ships to private companies. Most were scrapped in the 1980s. 	
 
 
 
 
 
 
 
 
 
 , later  a missile range instrumentation ship
 
 
 
 
 
 , later 
 

 
 
 
 
 
  went missing in 1980.

Marine series
C4-S-B1, C4-S-B2, C4-S-B5  ships built for troop and cargo transport. Marine series C4 ships were operated by the War Shipping Administration (WSA) through commercial companies acting as agents during World War II. Others became Navy hospital ships. Sun Shipbuilding of Chester, Pennsylvania, originally had a contract to build 30 of the C4 ships. The USMC prioritized Sun's expertise in building urgently needed T2-SE-A1 tankers and withdrew 20 C4s from Sun and assigned them to Kaiser's Richmond, California yard. Kaiser's C4 troop ship construction became Navy troop ships ("General" names), Sun's became WSA troopships operated by commercial agents.

C4-S-B1 (Sun) 
Only one in class, built by Sun Yards of Chester, Pennsylvania.
 SS Marine Eagle Completed as War Shipping Administration cargo ship but outfitted to carry limited troops. Operated by WSA December 1943 — March 1946 allocated to Army requirements. Acquired by the U.S. Army in March 1948 and renamed .  Built as a tank carrier in 1943. Converted for heavy lift in 1953.

C4-S-B2 (Sun) 
14 built by Sun Ship for World War II were used as troop ships in 1944 and 1945. The United States Navy took over 6 to become s in May 1945 and painted them white. Along with military troop movement, the C4-S-B2 participated in Operation Magic Carpet to bring home troops and their families. After the war others were converted to cargo ships.
 SS Marine Angel -  Completed as War Shipping Administration troop ship. Operated April 1945 — March 1946 returning troops to U.S. from Europe and lastly Asia. Converted to laker in 1952, sold renamed McKee Sons.
 SS Marine Beaver - Became USN hospital ship .
 SS Marine Devil  - Completed as War Shipping Administration troop ship. Operated September 1944 — April 1946 to Europe and Asia including India. Converted to container ship.
 SS Marine Dragon - Completed as War Shipping Administration troop ship. Operated December 1944 — April 1946. Shuttle between U.K. and France. August 1945 to Pacific. Converted to container ship.
 SS Marine Dolphin - Became hospital ship .
   -  Completed as War Shipping Administration troop ship. Operated March 1945 — May 1946 Europe and Pacific. Assigned with  December 1945 as transport for India-Burma theater return of troops. Converted to container.
 SS Marine Panther - Completed as War Shipping Administration troop ship. Operated October 1944 — May 1946 operating from New York to Europe, then via Suez to India. From New York to India and Philippines to Seattle from which the ship returned to India. Converted to container ship.
 SS Marine Wolf  - Completed as War Shipping Administration troop ship operating July 1944 — October 1946 first in Atlantic then departing New York 6 December 1945 for India, Philippines and Los Angeles and Pacific operations. Reserve fleet 1946—1961. Sold, renamed Transglobe converted to container ship. Scrapped Spain 1974.
 SS Marine Raven - Completed as first "Marine" class War Shipping Administration troop ship to carry troops. Operated January 1944 — May 1946. Made 16 New York-Europe trips, then round the world leaving Newport News for India and Philippines to Seattle. Left Seattle via San Francisco to embark German POWs to Europe. Two voyages in European waters before released from transport duties 9 May 1946. Sold private 1961, Panamanian flag November 1973, scrapped 1976.

   - Completed as War Shipping Administration troop ship. Operated April 1944 — April 1946. First voyage Norfolk to Naples where operated locally for two months. Operated to Europe to October 1945 when transited through Suez to India for Seattle. Operated Pacific to April 1946. Converted to Great Lakes freighter ship in 1952 as the Joseph H. Thompson, then converted to barge 1990.
 SS Marine Walrus  -  Became hospital ship .

C4-S-B2 (Todd) 
Buit by Todd Brooklyn:
 SS Marine Hawk   - Became , later sold and converted to chemical carrier.
 SS Marine Lion  - Became  later was in collision and sunk in 1950.
 SS Marine Owl   - Became hospital ship  .

C4-S-B5 (Sun) 
Built by Sun Ships in 1945.
  - Cargo ship, WSA, agent Agwilines Inc, 31 August 1945 — 23 May 1946, laid up Suisun Bay with brief periods of maintenance until 10 December 1952 transfer to Military Sea Transportation Service. MSTS/MSC as USNS until 14 September 1973 lay up in James River, Reserve Fleet. Sold for scrap 2003.
 SS Marine Flier - Cargo ship, WSA, agent American President Lines, 19 May 1945 — July 1946 then commercially operated under charter until title transferred 19 February 1951. Sold May 1955, renamed Keystone State. Delivered for scrapping Taiwan 8 January 1972.
 SS Marine Arrow - Cargo ship, WSA, agent American Hawaiian SS Co., 18 June 1945 — August 1946 then commercially operated under charter until sold 31 January 1951. Sold May 1955, renamed Hoosier State. Delivered for scrapping Taiwan 10 November 1971.
 SS Marine Runner - Cargo ship, WSA, agent American Hawaiian SS Co., 29 September 1945 — December 1946 then commercially operated under charter until title transferred 5 March 1951. Sold March 1955, renamed Wolverine State. Delivered for scrapping Taiwan 29 October 1971.
 SS Marine Star - Cargo ship, WSA, agent American Hawaiian SS Co., 22 July 1945 — August 1946 then commercially operated under charter until laid up James River Reserve Fleet 15 September 1947. Sold 29 June 1951, delivered buyer December 1952 for use as "Laker". Renamed Aquarama July 1955.

C4-S-A3 (Kaiser) 
 ships built by Kaiser Shipyards in Richmond, California, in 1945 and 1946, as WSA troopship.
  - sold renamed SS Transcolorado
 SS Marine Perch  C4-S-A3 - Completed as War Shipping Administration troop ship. Operated October 1945 — February 1946 allocated to Army requirements in Pacific and Atlantic. 1946 WSA transport requirements. Later Sold private in 1965, in collision and sank 1978. 
 SS Marine Swallow  C4-S-A3 - Completed as War Shipping Administration troop ship. Operated November 1945 — into 1946 in Pacific. Sold private in 1965, converted to bulk carrier Missouri, Panamanian 1974 named Ogden Missouri, scrapped in 1978.
 Built by Kaiser Shipyards in Vancouver, Washington, in 1945 and 1946, as WSA troopship.
 SS Marine Tiger - Completed as War Shipping Administration troop ship. Operated July 1944 — into 1946 allocated to Army requirements. Pacific service, including January 1946 transport of Italian POWs to Naples from Los Angeles. Returned 20 February, released from Army requirements, one WSA operation to South Africa until placed in reserve fleet 7 May 1946. In 1966 renamed Oakland converted to container ship, scrapped Taiwan September 1973.
 SS Marine Shark  - Completed as War Shipping Administration troop ship. Operated September 1945 — 1946. Pacific to 21 February 1946 when sailed from San Francisco to France for operations in Atlantic. Sold private 1968 renamed Charleston  converted to container ship, later scrapped. 
 SS Marine Cardinal - Completed as War Shipping Administration troop ship. Operated September 1945 — April 1946 returning troops to U.S. from Asia. Sold private in 1964 renamed Baltimore and converted to container ship, later scrapped.
 SS Marine Falcon  - Completed as War Shipping Administration troop ship. Operated September 1945 — May 1946 returning troops from Asia including India. Sold private in 1966 renamed Trenton converted to container ship, later scrapped
 SS Marine Flasher  - Completed as War Shipping Administration troop ship. Operated September 1945 — April 1946 returning troops from Asia and northern Europe. Sold private 1966 renamed Long Beach converted to container ship, later scrapped
 SS Marine Jumper (T-AP-200) - Completed as War Shipping Administration troop ship. Operated October 1945 — May 1946 in Pacific. Sold private 1966 renamed Panama converted to container ship, later scrapped. 
 USNS Marine Serpent (T-AP-202) - Completed as War Shipping Administration troop ship. Operated October 1945 — July 1946 in Pacific. 8 May 1952 became Military Sea Transportation Service USNS vessel to 1968. Sold to private in 1968 renamed Galveston  converted to container ship, later scrapped.
 SS Ernie Pyle WSA troopship, used for displaced persons (DPs) refugees after World War II, sold private in 1965, scrapped in 1978.
  - Completed as War Shipping Administration troop ship. Operated November 1945 — 1946 returning troops to U.S. from Europe, Asia and lastly Barbados.
  - Completed as War Shipping Administration troop ship. Operated December 1945 — May 1946 in Pacific. Commercial operators and reserve fleet to 1950 when operated by Military Sea Transportation Service then layup 1958. Commercial as Transcolumbia 1967 — October 1968 when transferred to Military Sealift Command. Scrapped 1988.
  - Completed as War Shipping Administration troop ship. Operated December 1945 — April 1946 Japan then Puerto Rico and Jamaica.  7 April to 21 October 1949 as U.S. Army Transport carrying refugees and displaced persons from Germany. Prospective MSTS (T-AP-201) but not acquired.  Sold converted to passenger ship. In 1965 converted as dry cargo. Scrapped in 1972
  - Completed as War Shipping Administration troop ship. Operated December 1945 — 1946 in Pacific. Sold commercial renamed Yellowstone July 1965 and converted to bulk carrier. Sank 13 June 1978 off Gibraltar.

C4-S-A4 (Kaiser) 
 ships built by Kaiser Shipyards in Richmond, California, in 1946 for break bulk cargo
 SS Marine Leopard  - Sold private in 1951, scrapped in 1972
 SS Marine Snapper - Sold private in 1951, scrapped in 1972

Mount series
C4-S-A3  as break bulk cargo ship.
 Built by Kaiser Shipyards in Vancouver, Washington, in 1946.
 SS Mount Davis - Sold private in 1951, scrapped in 1971.
 SS Mount Greylock - Sold private in 1951, scrapped in 1971.
 SS Mount Mansfield - Sold private in 1951, scrapped in 1980.
 SS Mount Rogers  - Sold private in 1951, scrapped in 1971.
 SS Mount Whitney - Sold private in 1951, scrapped in 1971.  (Seagoing cowboys ship in 1946 and 1947)

Named after a person
C4-S-A3  as a break bulk ship in 1946.
 Built by Kaiser Shipyards in Vancouver, Washington.
 SS Scott E. Land  - Sold private in 1951, scrapped in 1980
 SS Willis Vickery - Sold private in 1951, scrapped in 1979
 SS Louis McH. Howe - Sold private in 1951, scrapped in 1980
 SS Ernie Pyle - Sold private in 1965, scrapped in 1978

Hospital ships

C4-S-B2 DWT: 15,300
 Built by Sun Yards in Chester, Pennsylvania, in 1944 and 1945.
  (laid down as Marine Hawk)
  (laid down as Marine Lion)
  (laid down as Marine Dolphin)
  (laid down as Marine Walrus) 
  (laid down as Marine Beaver)
  (laid down as Marine Owl)

M-class ships
 C4-S-49a 
Four cargo/passenger liners were built for the Grace Line 1963–1964 by Bethlehem Steel Sparrows Point, Maryland.
 SS Santa Magdelena 
 SS Santa Mariana 
 SS Santa Maria 
 SS Santa Mercedes

Jet-class ships
C4-S-49b 
 Built in 1965 by Bethlehem Steel of Sparrows Point, Maryland. The last two C4 ships were constructed in 1966 for Prudential Lines.
 SS Prudential Seajet
 SS Prudential Oceanjet

Mariner-class ships
They were some of the largest and fastest ships in the world when they were completed. Built between 1952 and 1955.
 C4-S-1 class
 Built by Bethlehem Steel Co., SB Division, Quincy, Massachusetts, in 1952.
 Old Colony Mariner
 Cornhusker State Mariner
 Pine Tree Mariner  Converted to passenger ship, Mariposa in 1956.
 Nutmeg Mariner
 Wolverine Mariner
 Bethlehem Steel Co., SB Division, Sparrows Point, Maryland
 Free State Mariner    Converted to passenger ship, Monterey in 1957. Renamed *Monte in 2006, scrapped in 2007.
 Mountain Mariner 
 Gopher Mariner
 Show Me Mariner
 Sunflower Mariner
 Built by Bethlehem Pacific Coast Steel Corp., San Francisco, California
 Golden Mariner
 Built by Ingalls SB Corp., Pascagoula, Mississippi, in 1952.
 Lone Star Mariner
 Evergreen Mariner Became the USN ship , an attack cargo ship. Scrapped in 2011.
 Magnolia Mariner
 Cotton Mariner
 Pelican Mariner
 Peninsula Mariner
 Built by Newport News SB & DD Co., Newport News, Virginia, in 1952.
 Old Dominium Mariner
 Tar Heel Mariner
 Volunteer Mariner
 Palmetto Mariner
 Cracker State Mariner
 Built by New York SB Corp., Camden, New Jersey, in 1953.
 Garden Mariner 
 Diamond Mariner - Became the USN ship , an attack transport ship.
 Empire State Mariner - Became the USN ship USS Observation Island as a missile range instrumentation ship and later a missile test platform until 2014.
 Prairie Mariner Became the USN ship , an attack transport ship.
 Silver Mariner
 Built by Sun SB & DD Co., Chester, Pennsylvania, in 1953.
 Keystone Mariner
 Buckeye Mariner
 Hoosier Mariner
 Bagder Mariner - Converted to passenger ship,  in 1953.
 Hawkeye Mariner
 Built by Bethlehem Pacific Coast Steel Corp., San Francisco, California, in 1953
C4-S-1f built by Todd San Pedro, the three were C4-S-1a converted in 1955 for Pacific Far East Lines cargo.
 Golden Bear
 Korean Bear
 Japan Bear
 Built by Bethlehem Steel Co., Key Highway Yard, Baltimore, Maryland, in 1953
C4-S-1h Conversion for break bulk ships for American President Lines in 1955.
 President Hayes (IV)  (Old Dominium Mariner)
 President Jackson (IV) (Volunteer Mariner)
 President Adams (IV)  (Palmetto Mariner)
 President Coolidge (II) (Cracker State Mariner)
C4-S-1t
Built by Bethlehem Shipbuilding Corporation in San Francisco in 1962 for Pacific Far East Lines
 China Bear LASH carrier, scrapped 1986 
 Philippine Bear LASH carrier, scrapped 1986 

Mail ships
New bow thrusters were also installed. Operator American Mail Line. . Built in 1962. 
 Washington Mail - Became 
 Japan Mail  Became 
 Philippine Mail Converted to containership in 1971, renamed President Eisenhower in 1975, then Santa Paula in 1983, then American Banker in 1985 and scrapped in 2004.

State ships
 Built by Newport News for States SS Company in 1962. . 
C4-S-1u
 California Oregon Washington HawaiiAfrican ships
Built by Ingalls Shipbuilders for Farrell Lines. .
C4-S-58a
 African Comet African Meteor African Mercury Used in a location shot for the movie The French Connection
 African Neptune African Dawn African SunMoon ship
Built by Newport News for United States Lines in 1961. .
C4-S-57a
 Pioneer MoonAmerican ships
Built by Newport News for States SS Company in 1959. ,  length at the waterline,  top speed.
 C4-S-57a 	
 American Challenger - Scrapped in 1988
 American Charger - Scrapped in 1988
 American Champion - Scrapped in 1988
 American Chieftain - Scrapped in 1988
Built by Sun Ship for United States Lines in 1964 and 1965. . 
 C4-S-64a
 American Rover - Scrapped in 2004
 American Racer American Ranger - Scrapped in 2004
 American Reliance American Resolute - Scrapped in 2004
Built by Beth Quincy for United States Lines in 1962 and 1963. .  
 C4-S-57a
 American Courier - Scrapped in 1988
 American Commander - Scrapped in 1988
 American Corsair - Scrapped in 1988
 American Contractor - Scrapped in 1988
 American Contender - Scrapped in 1988
 American Crusader - Scrapped in 1988
 Pioneer Moon - Scrapped in 1988

Ro-Ro ships
Built by for the USN in 1967. One roll-on/roll-off ship in class C4-ST-67a
 

Notable incidents
 Marine Perch a C4-S-A3, was renamed SS Yellowstone. Five crewmen on Yellowstone were killed and two were injured, none on IBN Batoutaand. The bow of IBN Batoutaand struck deep into Yellowstone.
On 25 August 1950 she sank after a in collision with the freighter SS Mary Luckenbach in heavy fog off San Francisco. Of the crew of 550, 23 were lost in the sinking.
 , built in 1944, was sold a few times and renamed SS Poet. In 1980 she went missing without a trace and is presumed sunk. her cargo was 13,500 tons of bulk corn that she loaded at Girard Point Terminal in South Philadelphia, she was to steam to Port Said, Egypt. There was a severe storm in the Atlantic Ocean at the time she vanished and she was low in the water with her heavy load.
SS Cornhusker Mariner ran aground on the night of 6 and 7 July 1953 in the typhoon "Kit" as it passed close to Pusan Harbor.

See also
 Type C1 ship
 Type C2 ship
 Type C3 ship
 T2 tanker
 Liberty ship
 Victory ship
 Hog Islander
 U.S. Merchant Marine Academy

Notes and citations

Bibliography
 American Merchant Marine at War - C4 ships
 Charles, Roland W., Troopships of World War II (1947), The Army Transportation Association
 MARAD Vessel History Database
 US Maritime Commission Details and Outboard Profiles of Maritime Commission Vessels, The C4 Cargo Ship, Conversions and Subdesigns
 US Maritime Commission overview
 US Maritime Commission - Technical Specifications for Ships including definitions of terms
 From America to United States: The History of the long-range Merchant Shipbuilding Programme of the United States Maritime Commission, by L.A. Sawyer and W.H. Mitchell. London, 1981, World Ship Society
 Ships for Victory: A History of Shipbuilding under the U.S. Maritime Commission in World War II'', by Frederic C. Lane

External links

Troop ships of the War Shipping Administration
Auxiliary ship classes of the United States Navy
Ship types
General G. O. Squier-class transports